Events from the year 1839 in the United States.

Incumbents

Federal Government 
 President: Martin Van Buren (D-New York)
 Vice President: Richard M. Johnson (D-Kentucky)
 Chief Justice: Roger B. Taney (Maryland)
 Speaker of the House of Representatives: James K. Polk (D-Tennessee) (until March 4), Robert Mercer Taliaferro Hunter (W-Virginia) (starting December 16)
 Congress: 25th (until March 4), 26th (starting March 4)

Events
 February 11 – The University of Missouri is established in Columbia, Missouri, becoming the first public university west of the Mississippi River.
 March 5 – Longwood University is founded in Farmville, Virginia.
 March 7 – Baltimore City College, the third public high school in the United States, is established in Baltimore, Maryland.
 March 23 – The Boston Morning Post first records the use of "OK".
 August 8 – The Beta Theta Pi fraternity is founded in Oxford, Ohio.
 September 9 – In the Great Fire of Mobile, Alabama hundreds of buildings are burned.
 October – Robert Cornelius takes the first photographic self portrait in the United States. 
 November 11 – The Virginia Military Institute is founded in Lexington, Virginia.
 November 27 – In Boston, Massachusetts, the American Statistical Association is founded.

Undated
 The first U.S. state law permitting women to own property is passed in Jackson, Mississippi.
 Episcopal High School, Alexandria, Virginia, is founded, the first in the state.

Ongoing
 Second Seminole War (1835–1842)

Births
 February 9 – Laura Redden Searing, deaf poet and journalist (died 1923)
 March 9 – Phoebe Knapp, hymn writer (d. 1908)
 April 7 – David Baird, Ireland-born U.S. Senator from New Jersey from 1918 to 1919 (died 1927)
 July 8 – John D. Rockefeller, oil industry business magnate and philanthropist (died 1937)
 August 1 – Middleton P. Barrow, U.S. Senator from Georgia from 1882 to 1883 (died 1903)
 August 23 – George Clement Perkins, U.S. Senator from California from 1893 to 1915 (died 1923)
 August 26 – Hernando Money, U.S. Senator from Mississippi from 1897 to 1911 (died 1912)
 September 2 – Henry George, writer, politician and political economist (died 1897)
 September 10 – Charles Sanders Peirce, philosopher, logician, scientist, and founder of pragmatism (died 1912)
 September 18 – William J. McConnell, U.S. Senator from Idaho from 1890 to 1891 (died 1925)
 September 28 – Frances Willard, American educator, temperance reformer and women's suffragist (died 1898)
 September 29 – James Kimbrough Jones, U.S. Senator from Arkansas from 1885 to 1903 (died 1908)
 October 20 – Augustus Octavius Bacon, U.S. Senator from Georgia from 1895 to 1914  (died 1914)
 November 4 – Thomas M. Patterson, Ireland-born U.S. Senator from Colorado from 1901 to 1907 (died 1916)
December 5 – George Armstrong Custer, U.S. Army Officer and Cavalry Commander from Ohio from 1861 to 1876 (died 1876)
December 12 – Caroline Ingalls (b. Caroline Lake Quiner), American pioneer, mother of author Laura Ingalls Wilder (died 1924)

Deaths
 January 14 – John Wesley Jarvis, portrait painter (born c.1781 in Great Britain)
 February 26 – Sybil Ludington, heroine of the American Revolutionary War (born 1761)
 April 1 – Benjamin Pierce, governor of New Hampshire from 1827 to 1828 and from 1829 to 1830, father of 14th President of the United States Franklin Pierce (born 1757)
 April 2 – Hezekiah Niles, magazine publisher (born 1777)
 April 5 – John Tipton, U.S. Senator from Indiana from 1832 to 1839 (born 1786)
 April 22 – Samuel Smith, U.S. Senator from Maryland from 1822 to 1833 (born 1752)
 May 11 – Thomas Cooper, political philosopher (born 1759)
 June 10 – Nathaniel Hale Pryor, sergeant in the Lewis and Clark Expedition (born 1772)
 July 16 – The Bowl (Di'wali), Cherokee chief, shot (born c.1756)
 August 22 – Benjamin Lundy, abolitionist (born 1789)
 September 28 – William Dunlap, actor-manager, dramatist and painter (born 1766)
 December 4 – John Leamy, merchant (born 1757 in Ireland)

See also
Timeline of United States history (1820–1859)

External links
 

 
1830s in the United States
United States
United States
Years of the 19th century in the United States